Northern Blues may refer to

 Preston Football Club (VFA), also known as Northern Bullants or Northern Blues; former Victorian Football Association and Victorian Football League team, Australia
 Northern Blues (album), an album by Kristofer Åström
 Plebejus idas, a butterfly commonly known as the northern blue